Haj Muhammad Ben Abdessalam al-Muqri (February 2, 1854 – September 9, 1957) was a senior Moroccan official of the late 19th and early 20th century. He was an adviser and grand vizier to several sultans of Morocco, including under French colonial domination.

Early life
Muhammad Al-Muqri came from a well-known family whose descendants successively held government portfolios in Morocco. They trace their lineage back to 16th and 17th century historian and statesman Ahmed al-Moqri who, coming from Tlemcen in Algeria, had settled in Fes then in Marrakesh to serve under Saadi Sultan Ahmed Al-Mansur Al-Dhahabi.Muhammad al-Moqri was born in Oujda (February 1851) to Abdesallam al-Moqri (1830–1903), who held the position of Lamin of Moulay Hafid, and a Fassi woman from the Zghari family.

Career
He began his career in government during the reign of Muhammad IV of Morocco, the father of Hassan I of Morocco. During this period of time, al-Muqri is alleged to have attended the opening of the Suez Canal where he met with Emperor Napoleon III and Empress Eugénie in 1869. After the death of Hassan I, sultan, Abd al-Aziz seized the throne.

Algeciras Conference 

At that time, Al Muqri was the country's representative to the 1906 Algeciras Conference at which Germany's demand for a say in Moroccan affairs was rejected in favor of France and Spain. In recognition of his efforts to resolve the Moroccan Crisis leading up to the international conference, Abd al-Aziz appointed al-Muqri as his Minister of Finance and in 1908, his  or Grand Vizier, a post he would hold on and off under each of the succeeding sultans until 1955. 
In 1909, the new sultan Abd Al-Hafid restored him to the post of Minister of Finance but promoted him to Grand Vizier in 1911. Al-Muqri resigned the post two years later, but was reappointed to it by Sultan Yusef, and was kept in the position by his successor, Sultan Muhammad ben Youssef, when he ascended the throne in 1927. In 1953, when Muhammad ben Youssef was deposed by the French for nationalist agitation and replaced by his uncle, the French puppet monarch Muhammad Ben Arafa, the colonial authorities decided to keep al-Muqri in his position. Once independence was promised, Ben Arafa abdicated, and al-Muqri was chosen by colonial authorities to head the Regency, among other dignitaries such as Pacha Fatmi Benslimane, until the exiled Sultan Muhammad could return to the country and assume the throne.

Death 
Al-Muqri (sometimes spelled El Mokri) left politics in 1955, shortly before Morocco gained its independence. He died two years later, "penniless and dishonored" for having backed Mohammed Ben Aarafa. He was purportedly a centenarian.

Legacy 
After his death his residence in Rabat (known as Dar el Mokri) became an infamous location of detention and torture in the 1950s, 60s and up to the 1970s, during what was termed as the Years of Lead.

Family
Muhammad al-Muqri married three women (one Algerian and two Moroccan) with whom he had five sons and a daughter, all born during 1890–1900:
Taieb al-Moqri, Pasha of Casablanca and Minister of finance.
Hammed al-Moqri, Khalifa of the Pasha of Fes
Tahar al-Moqri, Pasha of Safi and head of the customs of Casablanca (studied in France)
Mokhtar al-Moqri, Pasha and head of the customs of Tangier (studied in France)
Thami al-Moqri, Minister of Finance and first agricultural engineer of Morocco. 
Rkia al-Moqri, married Moulay Hafid then his brother Moulay Youssef.
Zineb al-Moqri, married Madani El Glaoui, grand vizier then his brother Thami El Glaoui, Pacha Of Marrakech.

Longevity claim
It is claimed that al-Moqri died at the reputed age of 112, according to the Guinness Book of World Records, or even of 116, according to other sources. Both figures are doubtful. There are no birth records or other evidence for these claims. It is rare to attain such an age and unheard of to be head of government at 110 or 114. John Gunther's book Inside Africa (published 1955) says he was born in 1851: other sources list his birth year as 1854. Vermeren gives 1860. The Britannica Book of the Year gives his birthdate as February 1841.

Notes

People from Oujda
Moroccan centenarians
Men centenarians
1851 births
1957 deaths
Government ministers of Morocco
Year of birth uncertain
19th-century Moroccan people
Moroccan civil servants